George Murdoch (1924 or 1925 – 29 September 1983) was an Aberdeen taxi driver who, on 29 September 1983, was the victim of a notorious and brutal unsolved murder dubbed the 'Cheese Wire Murder'. Having picked up a passenger in his 20s or 30s on Aberdeen's Queen's Road, Murdoch was taken to Pitfodels Station Road on the city outskirts and attacked in brutal circumstances with a cheese wire. Two teenagers witnessed the man being strangled to death in the street and alerted the police, but help was unable to arrive in time. The killer stole Murdoch's fare money and wallet, but the victim only had as little as £21 on him and it is not known for certain whether robbery was the motive. The murder is one of Aberdeen and Scotland's most notorious unsolved crimes and was said at the time to have "shocked the nation". In September 2022, police appealed for information on a man seen in Aberdeen's Wilson's Sports Bar in 2015, saying he was in his 60s or 70s and wearing an Iron Maiden T-shirt. Police say they believed he has information which could help solve the case and ask him to come forward.

Background
Murdoch was born and raised in Aberdeen and was described as a likeable individual who was "just an ordinary working man". His nephew described him as "kind and gentle - the nicest of guys". He enjoyed keeping pigeons and boating. He had been happily married for 37 years to wife Jessie, although in the late 1970s had been made redundant from his job at a factory. To make ends meet he took up work as a taxi driver, although he didn't particularly like the job and his wife worried about his safety on night shifts. He insisted to his wife that she didn't need to worry and said that if anyone ever tried to attack and rob him he would never fight them and would just hand over the money.

Murder

On Thursday 29th September 1983, 58-year-old Murdoch was working an evening shift. At around 8:30pm his Ford Cortina car was seen parked in the busy Queen's Road in Aberdeen as he picked up a fare in his taxi. His taxi had been flagged down by a man in his 20s. Murdoch radioed through to the taxi control room that he and his fare were heading to Culter on the western outskirts of the city. After driving two miles in his taxi towards Culter, he turned onto Pitfodels Station Road, just on the outskirts of the city in Braeside, where his vehicle stopped. Murdoch was then brutally attacked by his passenger, who used a cheese wire as a garotte. As the pair struggled, they spilled out onto the road, where two boys passing on their bikes witnessed Murdoch being strangled. Murdoch was desperately calling for help and the two boys raced to call the police, but the police did not arrive in time and the attacker killed Murdoch. The murder weapon, the cheese wire, was found at the scene.

The murder made headline news nationally and was said to have "sent shockwaves" across Aberdeen and "shocked the nation". The murderer was dubbed the "cheese wire killer". The callousness of the killer was noted, with him having brought a cheese wire out with him that night, presumably to attack someone, and having killed a man who always said he would never try and fight a potential robber. Murdoch's wife Jessie never recovered after the murder and her health declined, fearing that the killer was going to come back for her. She died on 24 March 2004, not knowing who killed her husband.

Murder inquiry

The police launched a massive manhunt to find the murderer at the time, visiting 10,000 homes and taking 8,000 statements. The killer was described as between 20 and 30 years old, and was wearing dark clothing which police said could have been bloodstained after the attack. He was said to be 5ft 7in tall, clean shaven, thin and with short dark hair. He would have taken the cheese wire out with him that night, indicating it may have been a premediated murder. Murdoch's wallet and his fares had been stolen by the killer. Murdoch had only had between £21 and £35 on him and police could not say for certain if robbery had been the motive for the murder.

Appeals were made for anyone in the Queen's Road area of the city between 8:15 and 8:45pm that night to come forward. A sighting of a man with blood on his hands was made shortly after the murder at the local "Mr Chips" takeaway on the Great Western Road. The sighting was reported by the employee who had served him, but the blood-stained man was never traced. The man was wearing dark clothing, with dark hair and in his early 20s, which fitted the description of the killer. He had several scratches to his face, a bruised eye and was asking for plasters to apply to his cut hand. This man would likely be in his mid to late 50s in 2022.

In the early 1980s, the city of Aberdeen was rapidly changing due to the sudden growth of the oil industry, and this industry had brought with it many transient people to Aberdeen from outside the area. Police considered this when attempting to find the killer.

Cold case investigations

In 2022, the family of Murdoch and a local newspaper came together to offer a £20,000 reward for information leading to the capture of the killer. The case featured on Crimewatch Live on 14 March 2022, which led to new leads. Dozens of people came forward with new information, and Crimewatch Live released a statement saying "The George Murdoch case has clearly struck a chord". Murdoch's nephew pleaded for people to come forward to give the family closure, saying: "Closure to a family is like gold dust, something that you crave for, that you need. Even after 38 years, a family care. We've always cared. We always will".

In September 2022, police revealed they wanted to trace a man seen in Wilson's Sports Bar in Aberdeen in 2015 wearing an Iron Maiden T-shirt, saying that they believed he may be able to help with the inquiry. He was described as being small, stocky in his 60s or 70s and local to Aberdeen. The lead detective on the case, James Callander, said: "Following last year's appeal we now have information about a man we would like to speak to as we believe he may be able to assist with our investigation into the murder of George. "We continue to receive information about what may have happened to George, which is very encouraging and I would like to thank the public for this. The public's continued assistance and support is vital in order to bring this inquiry to a conclusion and provide much needed closure to George's family."

Lasting notoriety
The case was featured on the STV documentary series Unsolved in 2004. The series focused on Scotland's most infamous unsolved murders. Several murders featured on the programme have since been solved: Vicky Hamilton (2007), Shamsudden Mahmood (2008), Elaine Doyle (2014), Tracey Wylde (2019) and Renee and Andrew Macrae (2022). In two more cases, Caroline Glachan and Brenda Page, trials for the alleged murders are due to be held in 2022 and 2023 respectively.

Murdoch's murder was featured on STV News at Six on 28 September 2018 after a new appeal was made on the murder.

On the episode of Crimewatch Live which appealed for information of Murdoch's case on 14 March 2022, Murdoch's murder was described as having become one of the most notorious unsolved cases in the north-east of Scotland and one of Aberdeen's "darkest episodes".

References

External links
Crimewatch Live reconstruction and appeal on the murder, 14 March 2022 (0:53-13:13)
STV News at Six news report on the murder, 28 September 2018

1983 in Scotland
1983 murders in the United Kingdom
Murder in Scotland
Crime in Scotland
Scottish people
Unsolved murders in Scotland
Aberdeen
Deaths by person in England
September 1983 events in the United Kingdom
1983 in British law
Male murder victims